Jagatpur Theh is a village in Shaheed Bhagat Singh Nagar district of Punjab State, India. The village is administrated by Sarpanch an elected representative of the village.

Demography 
As of 2011, Jagatpur Theh has a total number of 6 houses and population of 28 of which 12 include are males while 16 are females according to the report published by Census India in 2011. The literacy rate of Jagatpur Theh is 77.78%, higher than the state average of 75.84%. The population of children under the age of 6 years is 1 which is 3.57% of total population of Jagatpur Theh, and child sex ratio is approximately 0 as compared to Punjab state average of 846.

As per the report published by Census India in 2011, 10 people were engaged in work activities out of the total population of Jagatpur Theh which includes 8 males and 2 females. According to census survey report 2011, 100% workers describe their work as main work and 0% workers are involved in Marginal activity providing livelihood for less than 6 months.

Education 
Amardeep Singh Shergill Memorial college Mukandpur, Sikh National College Banga and Guru Nanak College of Nursing in Dhahan are the nearest colleges.

Transport 

See also 
List of villages in India

References

External links 
 Tourism of Punjab
 Census of Punjab
 Locality Based PINCode

Villages in Shaheed Bhagat Singh Nagar district